Crispin Elsted is a Canadian poet and publisher. He was born on May 31, 1947, to Dennis and Isabel Elsted. He is the co-founder, with his wife Jan Elsted, of the book-publishing company Barbarian Press. His poetry collection Climate and the Affections was a shortlisted finalist for the Governor General's Award for English-language poetry and the Gerald Lampert Award in 1996.

Elsted has performed as a Shakespearean actor in repertory theatres and has composed, arranged and performed jazz and classical music.

Both Crispin and Jan Elsted are teachers and have previously taught at Meadowridge School in Maple Ridge, British Columbia.

References

20th-century Canadian poets
Canadian male poets
Canadian classical composers
Canadian jazz composers
Male jazz composers
Canadian publishers (people)
Canadian male Shakespearean actors
Male actors from British Columbia
Musicians from British Columbia
Writers from British Columbia
People from Mission, British Columbia
Living people
Year of birth missing (living people)